Commatica is a genus of moths in the family Gelechiidae.

Species
 Commatica acropelta Meyrick, 1914
 Commatica bifuscella (Forbes, 1931)
 Commatica chionura Meyrick, 1914
 Commatica crossotorna Meyrick, 1929
 Commatica cryptina (Walsingham, 1911)
 Commatica cyanorrhoa Meyrick, 1914
 Commatica emplasta Meyrick, 1914
 Commatica eremna Meyrick, 1909
 Commatica extremella (Walker, 1864)
 Commatica falcatella (Walker, 1864)
 Commatica hexacentra Meyrick, 1922
 Commatica lupata Meyrick, 1914
 Commatica metochra Meyrick, 1914
 Commatica nerterodes Meyrick, 1914
 Commatica ophitis (Walsingham, 1911)
 Commatica palirrhoa Meyrick, 1922
 Commatica parmulata Meyrick, 1914
 Commatica phanocrossa Meyrick, 1922
 Commatica placoterma Meyrick, 1918
 Commatica pterygota Meyrick, 1929
 Commatica servula Meyrick, 1922
 Commatica stygia Meyrick, 1922
 Commatica xanthocarpa Meyrick, 1922

References

 
Gelechiinae
Taxa named by Edward Meyrick
Moth genera